Budget Committee may refer to:
 Budget Committee (Iceland), a standing committee of the Icelandic parliament
 Committee of the Verkhovna Rada on issues of budget, a standing committee of Ukraine's unicameral parliament
 European Parliament Committee on Budgets, a committee of the European Parliament
 United States House Committee on the Budget, a standing committee of the United States House of Representatives
 United States Senate Committee on the Budget, a standing committee of the United States Senate